Little Mary Mixup was an American comic strip drawn by Robert Moore Brinkerhoff, which ran from January 2, 1918, to February 2, 1957.

History
Little Mary Mixup debuted as a gag-a-day strip featuring a mischievous nine-year-old girl. However, Mary aged slowly over time, and by World War II, she was an adventurous teenager who could participate in the war. By then, Little Mary Mixup had developed from a gag strip into an adventure strip that involved kidnappers, crooks, and a treasure hunt. However, the Sunday strips were separated from the daily continuity and continued to feature simple gags.

The Sunday page also had a topper strip, All in the Family, drawn by Brinkerhoff. The topper ran from April 3, 1932, to July 21, 1940.

The strip was distributed by Press Publishing (New York World) (1918-1931), World Feature Service (1931-1932) and United Feature Syndicate (1933–1957).

The strip appeared in 143 mostly minor newspapers. It ended in 1957, when Brinkerhoff retired.

References

External links

1918 comics debuts
1957 comics endings
Adventure comics
American comics characters
American comic strips
Child characters in comics
Comics characters introduced in 1918
Comics about women
Defunct American comics
Female characters in comics
Fictional tricksters
Gag-a-day comics